JEC/Krona Futsal, also known as Joinville or Krona Futsal, is a Brazilian futsal club from Joinville, Santa Catarina. Founded in 2006 it has won one Liga Futsal and six Campeonato Catarinense de Futsal. The team is a partnership between the sports club Joinville Esporte Clube and Krona Tubos e Conexões.

Club honours

National competitions
 Liga Futsal: 2017
 Taça Brasil de Futsal (2): 2011, 2017
 Superliga de Futsal: 2012
 Copa Cataratas de Futsal: 2013

State competitions
 Campeonato Catarinense de Futsal (6): 2009, 2010, 2012, 2013, 2014, 2017

Current squad

References

External links
 JEC/Krona Futsal official website
 JEC/Krona Futsal LNF profile
 JEC/Krona Futsal in zerozero.pt

Futsal clubs established in 2006
Futsal clubs in Brazil
Sports teams in Santa Catarina (state)
2006 establishments in Brazil